The 1998 Piberstein Styrian Open was a women's tennis tournament played on outdoor clay courts at the Sportpark Piberstein in Maria Lankowitz, Austria that was part of Tier IV of the 1998 WTA Tour. It was the 26th edition of the tournament and was held from 6 July until 12 July 1998. First-seeded Patty Schnyder won the singles title.

Finals

Singles

 Patty Schnyder defeated  Gala León García 6–2, 4–6, 6–3
 It was Schnyder's 5th title of the year and the 5th of her career.

Doubles

 Laura Montalvo /  Paola Suárez defeated  Tina Križan /  Katarina Srebotnik 6–1, 6–2
 It was Montalvo's 2nd title of the year and the 4th of her career. It was Suárez's 6th title of the year and the 7th of her career.

External links
 WTA tournament edition details
 ITF tournament edition details

Piberstein Styrian Open
WTA Austrian Open
WTA